Botic van de Zandschulp was the defending champion but withdrew before his semifinal match against Taro Daniel.

Daniel won the title after defeating Sebastian Ofner 6–1, 6–2 in the final.

Seeds

Draw

Finals

Top half

Bottom half

References

External links
Main draw
Qualifying draw

Tennis Challenger Hamburg - Singles